Sinta Nuriyah Wahid (also Sinta Wahid; 8 March 1948) is the widow of former Indonesian President Abdurrahman Wahid. She was First Lady of Indonesia from 1999 to 2001.

Biography 

Sinta was born in the Jombang Regency in 1948, the eldest daughter of 18 children.  She attended an Islamic boarding school, where, at age 13, she fell in love with Wahid, who was a teacher there. After her father, a professional calligrapher, refused to approve the marriage, Wahid, whose father was the leader of Nahdlatul Ulama, went abroad to study. When Wahid proposed again from Baghdad, Sinta accepted, marrying him three years before he returned to Indonesia in a ceremony where Wahid's grandfather stood in as a proxy.

After Wahid returned in 1971, Sinta finished a degree in Sharia law.  She helped support their four children by making and selling candies.

In 1992, Sinta was in a car accident that left her paralyzed from the waist down. It took a year of physical therapy before she was able to move her arms. She then finished her women's studies graduate degree at the University of Indonesia by having university staff carry her on a stretcher up to the building's fourth floor.

Since her husband's impeachment, Sinta had been an outspoken defender of moderate Islam. She has pursued a tradition of holding inter-faith meals during Ramadan.  She has praised the bravery of Governor Basuki Tjahaja Purnama and has criticized polygamy as unfair.  After she was threatened by extremists, the Banser militia mobilized to protect her events. She was included in TIME 100 list as one of The Most Influential People in 2018.

References

|-

|-

1948 births
First ladies and gentlemen of Indonesia
Living people
Indonesian Muslims
People from Jombang Regency
Wahid family